Daniel Marius Șerbănică (born 25 June 1996) is a Romanian professional footballer who plays as a defender for Liga I side CS Mioveni.

Honours
SCM Pitești
Liga III: 2016–17

References

External links
 
 
 Daniel Șerbănică at frf-ajf.ro

1996 births
Living people
Sportspeople from Pitești
Romanian footballers
Association football defenders
Liga I players
Liga II players
FC Argeș Pitești players
CS Mioveni players